The Lake Ellen Kimberlite is a poorly exposed volcanic breccia located about  northeast of Crystal Falls in the Upper Peninsula of Michigan.  The first publication in 1981  describing the feature led to speculation that this or similar kimberlites in the area might have been the source of the diamonds discovered a century before in Wisconsin as well as a period of exploration by several minerals firms.

The kimberlite was discovered in 1971 when a logging road was bulldozed through the area exposing the unusual looking rock. The exposure consists of several small areas otherwise overlain by glacial till. The kimberlite is intruded into volcanic rocks of the Proterozoic Hemlock Formation. It is generally accepted that the pipe was emplaced about 180 million years ago.

The lake Ellen Kimberlite is popular with rock hounds as the classic indicator minerals (pyrope, magnesian ilmenite and chrome diopside) for kimberlite are easily found in the material, though few are of gem quality and size.   While there was considerable interest in diamond exploration in Michigan's Upper Peninsula and northern Wisconsin  for several years, no diamonds of commercial interest have been found.

See also
Lamproite
Elliott County Kimberlite

References 

Breccias
Diatremes of the United States
Geology of Michigan